Penelope J. Boston is a speleologist. She is associate director of the National Cave and Karst Research Institute in Carlsbad, New Mexico, and founder and director of the Cave and Karst Studies Program at New Mexico Institute of Mining and Technology in Socorro.  Among her research interests are geomicrobiology of caves and mines, extraterrestrial speleogenesis, and space exploration and astrobiology generally.

In the mid-1980s, Boston (then a graduate student at the University of Colorado Boulder) was one of the founders of the Mars Underground and helped organize a series of conferences called The Case for Mars. She was the last director of the NASA Astrobiology Institute before the Institute was suspended.

Biography
She has a B.S. in microbiology, geology, and psychology, and a M.S. in microbiology and atmospheric chemistry. She completed her Ph.D. from University of Colorado Boulder in 1985. During 2002–2004, she was Principal Investigator on the Caves of Mars Project, which, among other things, studied the effects on mice of an atmosphere rich in argon, and "flat crops" that might be grown in Martian caves.

She developed the concept of small jumping robots for Mars exploration. She gave a TEDtalk about the likelihood of life on Mars in 2006.

Her interest is in extremophiles (organisms which prefer or thrive in the extremes of altitude, cold, darkness, dryness, heat, mineralized environments, pressure, radiation, vacuum, variability, or weightlessness) which may be found in caves and karst on Earth, and she thinks should be looked for in equivalents of other objects in space from asteroids to planets.

An only child of theatrical parents, she writes poetry reflective of her world travel and uncommon specialty. In 2010 she was featured in Symphony of Science.  She continues to work with NASA on the Atacama Field Expedition.

Bibliography

; held May 26–29, 1993, at the University of Colorado, Boulder, Colorado.

See also
 Caves of Mars Project
 The Case for Mars

References

External links
 Prof. Boston's homepage at New Mexico Tech
 
 National Cave and Karst Research Institute of the U.S. National Park Service
 
 
 
 

Astrobiologists
Geomicrobiologists
Year of birth missing (living people)
Living people
American women geologists
American speleologists
Space advocates
University of Colorado alumni
New Mexico Institute of Mining and Technology faculty
20th-century American geologists
21st-century American geologists
20th-century American women scientists
21st-century American women scientists
American women academics